Biarritz (Basque also) is a city on the Bay of Biscay, on the Atlantic coast in the Pyrénées-Atlantiques department in the French Basque Country in southwestern France. It is a luxurious seaside tourist destination known for the Hôtel du Palais (originally built for the Empress Eugénie circa 1855), its casinos in front of the sea and its surfing culture.

Geography
Biarritz is located in the Pyrénées-Atlantiques department in the Nouvelle-Aquitaine region. It is part of the arrondissement of Bayonne. It is in the traditional province of Labourd in the French Basque Country.

Gallery

Climate

Biarritz has a temperate oceanic climate, Cfb in the Köppen climate classification. It is one of the wettest cities in Metropolitan France.

Etymology
In Basque, its name is Biarritz or Miarritze. Its current Gascon name is Biàrrits. The name for an inhabitant is Biarrot in French and Biarriztar or Miarriztar in Basque. The suffix -itz, as in Isturitz, is a Basque locative. The name appears as Bearriz in 1170, Bearids in 1186 and Bearritz in 1249.

Biarritz appears as Bearids and Bearriz in 1150, Beiarridz in 1165, Bearriz and Beariz in 1170, Bearidz (1186), Bearriz and Beariz (12th century), lo port de Beiarriz and Bearridz in 1261 (cartulaire de Bayonne). Other forms include Beiarid (1199), Bearritz (1249), Beiarriz and Beiarrids (1261), Bearridz (1281), Bearrits (1338), (rôles gascons), Bearritz (1498, chapitre de Bayonne38), Sanctus Martinus de Biarriz (1689, collations du diocèse de Bayonne, mearritcen (1712), Biarrits (1863, Dictionnaire topographique Béarn-Pays basque) and Biarritze and Miarritze.

History

Prehistory 
Analysis of stones from the Middle Paleolithic show that the Biarritz area was inhabited at that time.

Middle Ages 
The oldest mention of the city appears in a cartulary, Bayonne's Golden book, from 1186, where it is named Bearids; some years later the name used was Beiarrids. The first urban development was to the south, at the top and at the interior. Today this is near the location of the church of San Martin, the oldest church in Biarritz.

In 1152, Eleanor of Aquitaine married Henry II of England, who became suzerain of the Duchy of Aquitaine. Prince Edward, oldest son of Henry III of England, was invested with the duchy, and betrothed to Eleanor of Castile, who brought him rights over Gascony.
 
Two population centers are attested in the Middle Ages. On the one hand, the église Saint-Martin was active in the neighborhoods in the territory's interior, which were: 

On the other hand, the château of Belay (first mentioned in 1342), also called château de Ferragus, protected the coast and the current Port-Vieux (old port), while religious life and community assemblies took place at Notre-Dame-de-Pitié (a chapel mentioned in 1498), dominating the Port-des-Pêcheurs, or fishing port.

A document dated May 26, 1342 attested to this fishing activity, authorising les Biarrots to "(…) remit to Bayonne all the fresh fish that we and succeeding inhabitants of Biarritz can fish from the salt sea".

Construction of the château de Ferragus was decided by the English, on the foundations of a Roman work, at the summit of the promontory overlooking the sea, named Atalaye, used as a whale-observation post. This château had a double crenulated wall two meters thick, a drawbridge and four towers. Mentions of this château occur as late as 1603, in the letters patent of Henry IV. One tower remained as of 1739, when a daymark was established there, called de la Haille, then de la Humade. The tower disappeared in 1856.

Whaling 
Most of the documents, records and official agreements gathered in the archives from Biarritz mention whaling. This was the principal local industry. Consequently, the town's coat of arms features the image of a whale below a rowing boat manned by five sailors wearing berets, one of whom is preparing to throw a harpoon. This inscription is written on it: Aura, sidus, mare, adjuvant me (The air, the stars and the seas are helping me).

Biarritz has long made its living from the sea: from the 12th century onwards, it was a whaling town. In the 18th century, doctors claimed that the ocean at Biarritz had therapeutic properties, inspiring patients to make pilgrimages to the beach for alleged cures for their ailments. After the 7th century, Biarritz had many confrontations with Bayonne, with the Kingdom of England – Lapurdi was under its control – and with the Bishop of Bayonne. Almost all of the disputes were about whale hunting. In 1284, the town's right to hunt whales was reinstated by the authorities of Lapurdi and the Duchy of Aquitaine.

From the Middle Ages and Early modern period a watchtower has looked down over the sea at Biarritz, from "La Humade", waiting for the sight of a whale. Whenever those keeping watch saw a whale, they would burn wet straw, to create a large amount of smoke and thus communicate the news to their fellow countrymen. Eventually, however, the tower disappeared.

In the 16th century, as a consequence of the attacks suffered in this area, or for other reasons, the whales migrated to other places. Whale hunters from Lapurdi, therefore, crossed the Atlantic Ocean in pursuit of them, and they spent over a century in the Labrador Peninsula and on Newfoundland. Later, instead of hunting whales, they started cod fishing in Newfoundland. A century later, due to the ban on fishing off the coasts of North America and the steely competence of English and Dutch fishermen, the number of fishing boats from Biarritz diminished and nowadays, the Biarritz fishing industry in these areas has come to an end.

Even though the population from Biarritz was originally Basque, it is hard to assert whether the main language of the village was Basque or French.

The first lighthouse of the village was built in 1650.

18th century 

Biarritz was an independent municipality, until 1784, a clergyman, four sworn and the city was governed by twelve deputies. Deputies were democratically chosen: there were four neighbourhoods (Portua, Bustingorri, Hurlaga and Alto), and three deputies had to be chosen from each of them. However, deputies were chosen by the abbot and sworn. Since they had no Town House, they gathered in a ward near the church.  As they did not have a place for all the attending people, they made their meetings in the cemetery. That time, Biarritz was composed of around 1,700 citizens.

In the mid-18th century, the city began to change into a worldwide known bath-city.

19th century 

From 1784 onwards, after the French Revolution, taking a bath at the sea was no longer a behaviour of those who were fools; sea-baths were fashionable. In 1808, Napoleon himself broke prejudices and took a bath on the Basque Country's coastal water.

In 1840, the Town House or Municipality of Biarritz started to organize an initiative in order to promote and attract those who loved most the sea.

From the 11th century, Biarritz was a village dedicated to whale hunting, until Victor Hugo, found it in 1843. This writer made to Biarritz the following compliments on his book "Alpeak eta Pirinioak" :

« I have not met in the world any place more pleasant and perfect than Biarritz. I have never seen the old Neptune throwing joy and glory with such a force in the old Cybele. All this coast is full of humming. Gascony's sea grinds, scratches, and stretches on the reefs its never-ending whisper. Friendly population and white cheerful houses, large dunes, fine sand, great caves and proud sea, Biarritz is amazing. My only fear is Biarritz becoming fashionable. Whether this happens, the wild village, rural and still honest Biarritz, will be money-hungry. Biarritz will put poplars in the hills, railings in the dunes, kiosks in the rocks, seats in the caves, trousers worn on tourists. »

Either for good or for bad, Victor Hugo's prophecy was fulfilled. Biarritz planted poplars, tamarinds, hydrangeas, roses and pittosporums on the slopes and the hills, set railings on the dunes, covered moats with elegant stairs... and polluted with the speculation of the land and the money-hunger.

Humble and proud tourists praise Biarritz's coast, from the beach at the limit of Bidarte (Plage des Basques), to the cape of San Martin. Various hotels were made, as well as a municipal casino, the club Belleuve and the casino were opened in 1857, the thalassotherapy house, and wonderful luxury houses. Luxurious store shops from London and Paris were also set up in Biarritz, and 36 small newspapers were published in the village. 

Biarritz became more renowned in 1854 when Empress Eugenie (the wife of Napoleon III) built a palace on the beach (now the Hôtel du Palais). European royalty, including British monarchs Queen Victoria and King Edward VII (who caused a minor scandal when he called H. H. Asquith to kiss hands at Biarritz in 1908 rather than return to London for the purpose), and the Spanish king Alfonso XIII, were frequent visitors.

Biarritz's casino (opened 10 August 1901) and beaches make the town a notable tourist centre for Europeans and East Coast North Americans. The city has also become a prime destination for surfers from around the world, developing a nightlife and surf-based culture.

Originally, there were two settlement sites: the neighborhood that was around the church of San Martin, and the fishing-port defended by  château of Belay (also known as château of Ferragus). The coat of arms was a whaler, which was a symbol of the town.

Opened in June 1893, Biarritz's salt baths were designed and built by the architect Lagarde. From the gatzagas of Beskoitz and after passing through a  pipe, water ten times saltier than the sea was used. The baths were closed in 1953 and demolished in 1968.

The presence of French Republic's authorities and the fact of having launched the Paris-Henday train led Biarritz to become one of the most outstanding tourist areas all over Europe. The queen of the beaches became the beach of the kings: Oscar II of Sweden, Leopold of Belgium, tireless traveller, empress of Russia Maria Feodorovna, mother of Nicholas II of Russia, Empress Elisabeth of Austria, Natalie of Serbia and her son Alexander I of Serbia, George V from Britain, Edward VII and Britain's Queen Victoria, Alfonso XIII of Spain, aristocrats, rich people, actors, from Europe and South America... In the summer-time, high-status people gathered in Biarritz. Therefore, the number of population remarkably increased, from 5,000 to 18,000. At the end of the 19th century, 50,000 vacationers were gathering in Biarritz.

Belle Époque 

During the Belle Époque of European peace and prosperity, the department store called Biarritz Bonheur, created in 1894, enlarged twice (in 1911 and 1926), and still operating, became the temple of luxury and fashion. At the start of the 20th century, most of its workers spoke in English.

After World War II 

At the end of World War II in Europe, the U.S. Army's Information and Educational Branch was ordered to establish an overseas university campus for demobilized American service men and women in the French resort town of Biarritz. Under General Samuel L. McCroskey, the hotels and casinos of Biarritz were converted into quarters, labs, and class spaces for U.S. service personnel. The University opened 10 August 1945 and about 10,000 students attended an eight-week term.  This campus was set up to provide a transition between army life and subsequent attendance at a university in the US, so students attended for just one term. After three successful terms, the G.I. University closed in March 1946 (see G. I. American Universities).

The arrival of surfing in Europe 

In 1957, the American film director Peter Viertel was in Biarritz with his British actress wife Deborah Kerr working on the film The Sun Also Rises. One of his Californian friends came for a visit, and his use of a surfboard off Biarritz is recognized as the first time surfing was practised in Europe. Biarritz eventually became one of the most popular European surfing spots.

Main sights

Sights in Biarritz include:
 The Asiatica Museum houses a significant collection of Asian art primarily from India, Nepal, Tibet, and China.
 Museum of the Sea has 24 aquariums containing sharks and seals.
 Museum of the Ocean and Surf
 The Historical Museum of Biarritz, housed in the deconsecrated Anglican Church, St Andrew's. 
 The annual Biarritz Surf Festival, founded in 1993 at the Côte des Basques, is one of the premier surf events in Europe and longboarding events in the world.
 St-Martin's Church, constructed in the 12th century, restored in the mid-16th century.
 The Russian Orthodox Church, built in the 19th century for visiting Russian aristocrats, has a famous blue dome.
 The Chapelle Imperiale built for Empress Eugenie has an intricately decorated roof interior and elegant wall tiling. She also built a palace on the beach which is now the Hôtel du Palais.
 The Museum of Chocolate explains the history and manufacture of chocolate.
 Two large casinos, the Barrière and the Bellevue, sit on the waterfront near the Grande Plage.

Cliffs and lookouts lie to the west of the main beach.

Politics

Mayors

Demography

Economy
Although Biarritz's economy was based on fishing before, nowadays it has a modern economy due to the metropolitan location of Bayonne-Anglet-Biarritz. 
Together with Bayonne and Anglet, Biarritz takes part in the management of the BAB Airport.
The most important economic activities are:
Spa tourism
Sport (golf, surf and rugby)
Thalassotherapy
Industry. The most important industries are the following:
Séguier, French publishing house
Dassault Aviation, manufacturer of fuselage for Falcon planes.

Culture

Languages
As in the cases of Anglet and Bayonne, also located in the approximate cultural border between Gascony and the Basque Country, it is uncertain if the historic language of Biarritz was Basque or Gascon.

According to the book Atlas Linguistique de Gascogne, Biarritz is considered a Gascon town. But in 1863, Luis Luciano Bonaparte located the northern frontier of Basque in Biarritz, and in some neighborhoods it was without any doubt the most used language. However, over the course of the 20th century, French became the main language. Beginning in the 1990s, the municipal government of Biarritz has promoted the Basque language and culture. At the same time, Gascon has been promoted by various private institutions, for instance the group of Gascon culture Ací Gasconha. [19]

Museums
Sea Museum. Constructed in 1993 in the rock of Atalaia, it is an Art Déco building. It has a huge collection of sea animals and birds.
Museum of Chocolate
Asiatica, museum of the Eastern art. Art from India, Tibet, Nepal and China can be found
Museum of the History of Biarritz. Located in the Angelican Church of Saint Andrew in the 1980 decade
Cité de l'Ocean et du Surf, opened in 2011.

Music and dance
The city has the Ballet of Biarritz, which is the choreography location of France. Furthermore, it has the cultural centre Atabal and the chorus Oldarra, created in 1946.

Theatre
The emperors Napoleon III and Eugene of Montijo brought the sea-theater on the Old Port neighborhood into fashion. Nowadays, the light works made by Pierre Bideau can be seen at night in the clift.

Cinema
Two film festivals of cinema are celebrated in Biarritz:
Festival of Latinoamerican Cinema of Biarritz. 
International Festival of Audio-Visual Programs (FIPA)

Civil buildings
Hôtel du Palais or Eugénie House
Building of the Hotel of England, built in 1870 by Louis Moussempés
Natasha House
Sacchino or Castel Biarritz, house of Natalia of Serbia
Plaza Hotel
Casino of Biarritz, of "Art déco" style 
Lighthouse, built in 1834 in San Martin cape
Villa Black or Black House. Built by Alphonse Bertrand between 1880 and 1895
Goëland House, which from 2003 on is a hotel
Françon Castle
Boulard Castle
Pavilion of England
Fishermen House, in the port
The formerly health resort in the Old Port 
Miremont sweet shop

Religious buildings
Imperial Chapel
Saint Martin church
Saint Eugene church, built between 1898 and 1903
 and God's Mother Protection Church 
Synagogue of Biarritz

Rocks
 The Rocks of Biarritz are an important part of the city's attractions. Every year they erode by an estimated 70 centimeters.

Beaches
Biarritz has six beaches: Miramar, Big, Old Port, Coast of the Basque, Marbella and Milady

Gardens and Parks
Biarritz has 120 hectares of parks and two recreational lakes (Marion and Muriskot) 
In the city centre there are three gardens: the Pierre Forsans public garden (across from the Gare du Midi performance centre) and two others nearby (Lahouze Garden and Parc Mazon). The center of town also includes a number of open-air sports fields.

Infrastructures

Sport
Surfing in Biarritz is of a world-class standard and first appeared in 1957.  The town has a strong surfing culture, and is known worldwide for its surfing scene and the competitions it hosts yearly, including the Quiksilver/Roxy Jam tournament. In July 2011, Biarritz also hosted the Roxy Pro event, a tournament part of the ASP Women's World Tour.

The town is home to a prominent rugby union club, Biarritz Olympique.

Basque pelota is a very popular sport of the Basque country. Several local and international competitions take place in Biarritz.

The golf course near the lighthouse (Le Phare) was created in 1888 by British residents. In addition, the town has a large circular golf range area on the border with illbaritz.

Education

Schools
The city has two public schools (Villa Fal and Jean Rostand) and one private (Immaculée-Conception).

High schools
Malraux High Schools is the only one in Biarritz. There is also a tourism high school in the border of the Western neighborhood of La Négresse.

Transport
Biarritz station is easily accessible from Paris by France's high-speed train, the TGV, and more regionally from Bordeaux, by TGV or TER. Trains are also available to travel east towards Toulouse. Night trains regularly depart from Irun, south of Biarritz and pass through the city before heading to Paris during an overnight trip. Many tourists and regulars to the city have begun using the night train to take weekend trips to Biarritz and saving travel time by traveling at night. It is near N10 road towards Anglet and is served by airlines from France, the United Kingdom, Spain, Ireland and Germany.

Notable people and popular culture

Biarritz was the birthplace of:
 Yannick Bellon (1924–2019), film director
 Jacques Bergerac (1927–2014), actor
 Jean Borotra (1898–1994), tennis player
 Léopold Eyharts (born 1957), astronaut
 Ernest Fourneau (1872–1949), chemist
 Maurice Hankey, 1st Baron Hankey (1877–1963), British civil servant
 Maurice Journeau (1898–1999), composer
 Arnaud Massy (1877–1950), professional golfer
 Margaux Okou-Zouzouo (born 1991), basketball player

Other notable people associated with Biarritz:
 Aaron Bank (1902–2004), World War II Office of Strategic Services (OSS) agent and co-founder of the U.S. Army's Special Forces Group (later, Green Berets), a lifeguard and medical (physical) therapist's aide at Biarritz before he enlisted in the army in the late 1930s
 John Deacon (b. 1951), bass player for the band Queen. Deacon and his wife Veronica loved spending their holidays in Biarritz, and bought a holiday apartment there at the end of the 1980s, where they especially spent many months living in 1990.
 Louis Dewis (1872–1946), born Louis DeWachter, Belgian Post-Impressionist who, after fleeing Paris at the beginning of World War II, settled here in 1940, living at Villa Pat in Bellefontaine until his death
 Aimée de Heeren, born Soto-Maior de Sá< (1903–2006) WW2 Secret Service agent for President Getúlio Vargas, owned many jewels of Eugenie de Montijo and the villa La Roseraie, 12 rue Martias, where she spent summers for half a century, receiving kings, heads of state, and many famous guests
 Eugénie de Montijo (1826–1920), the wife of Napoléon III, who built the villa Eugénie, today the Hôtel du Palais
 Pablo de Sarasate (10 March 1844 – 20 September 1908), a well known Romantic Era Spanish composer born in Pamplona, Spain, who died in this city

Twin towns – sister cities

Biarritz is twinned with:
 Augusta, United States (1992)
 Cascais, Portugal (1986)
 Ixelles, Belgium (1958)
 Jerez de la Frontera, Spain (1997)
 Zaragoza, Spain (1986)

Festivities
The major festivities are celebrated on November 11, for Saint Martin. That day, the new gentleman of the Confrérie de l'Operne de Biarritz are proclaimed. Barnacle is their logotype and people who work in favor of ecology are chosen.
Since Biarritz is a city based in tourism, there are acts during the whole summer, such as pelota festivity, equestrian competition, concerts and recitals, folklore festivals, water acrobatic ski, sea trips, performances, rugby competitions, bullfights and night parties.

Since summer 2018, Biarritz hosts the festival of pop music "Biarritz en été" whose second edition took place on July 19, 20 and 21, 2019.

References

External links

 Official website 
 Tourist Information Office Biarritz 
 Biarritz Real Estate 

 
Communes of Pyrénées-Atlantiques
Labourd
Populated coastal places in France
Seaside resorts in France
Surfing locations in France
Cities in Nouvelle-Aquitaine